The Stone Coyotes are an American band that debuted with their first album in 1998. They hail from Massachusetts but tour primarily in Texas as that is where they receive their most radio airplay.

Background
Barbara Keith founded the family-revolved band in Massachusetts with her family. Doug Tibbles is her husband, and John Tibbles is his son, her stepson.  Barbara Keith is mainly the guitarist, and also writes most of their songs. Doug started playing drums for the band shortly before the trio was formed, when Keith was signed with Warner Brothers. John learned to play the bass guitar at eleven and started playing in the band when he was eighteen.

Be Cool
Be Cool is a New York Times bestselling crime novel written by Elmore Leonard. The novel, published in 1999, is the sequel to Get Shorty (1990), and was made into a major motion picture in 2005. Barbara Keith was a major influence to this novel, especially its plot. The song "Odessa" was written for the book. Five of her songs are mentioned in the actual text.

Discography

Hit The Ground Running (2019) EP
Sally in the Doorway (2017)
Rock Another Day (2014) Red Cat Records
A Wild Bird Flying (2012) Red Cat Records
I Couldn't Find You (2011) Red Cat Records
My Turn (2010) Red Cat Records
A Rude Awakening (2009) Red Cat Records
VIII (2008) Red Cat Records
Dreams of Glory (2006) Red Cat Records
Fire it Up (2005) Red Cat Records
Rise from the Ashes (2003) Red Cat Records
Ride Away from the World (2003) Red Cat Records
Born to Howl (2001) Red Cat Records
Situation out of Control (2000) Red Cat Records
Church of the Falling Rain (1998) Red Cat Records

References

External links
 

Rock music groups from Massachusetts
American country rock groups